The Wotjobaluk are an Aboriginal Australian people of the state of Victoria. They are closely related to the Wergaia people.

Language

R. H. Mathews supplied a brief analysis of the Wotjobaluk language (now known as Wergaia), describing what he called the Tyattyalla dialect of the Wotjobaluk around Albacutya He stated that it was characterised by four numbers: the singular, the dual, trial, and plural. There were, in addition, two forms of the trial number for the 1st person, depending on whether the person addressed was included or excluded. Thus one obtains: wutju (a man); "wutju-buliñ" (two men); wutju-kullik (three men); wutju-getyaul (several men).

In mid-2021 a language revival project started up at the Wotjobaluk Knowledge Place, established in December 2020 at Dimboola. A Wergaia language program would run over 20 weeks.

Country
Wotjobaluk territory took in some  inclusive of the Wimmera River, Outlet Creek and the two eutrophic lakes, Hindmarsh and Albacutya. Their southern borders down ran to Dimboola, Kaniva, and Servicetown. Their western frontier lay beyond Yanac, and to the east, as far as Warracknabeal and Lake Korong. Their northern horizon reached Pine Plains.

Social organisation
The Wotjobaluk were divided into 11 bands or clans:
 Lail-buil  between Pine Plains and the River Murray.
 Jakelbalak between Pine Plains and Lake Albacutya.
 Kromelak  at Lake Albacutya.
 Wanmung Wanmungkur at Lake Hindmarsh.
 Kapuu-kapunbara on the River Wimmera, towards Lake Hindmarsh.
 Jackalbarap west of Duwinbarap.
 Jarambiuk at Yarriambiack Creek (so called).
 Whitewurudiuk, east of Yarriambiack Creek.
 Kerabialbarap south of Mount Arapiles.
 Murra-murra-barap in the Grampians.

Hunting lore
Wotjobaluk hunters told Adolf Hartmann that kangaroos had acute hearing, and could twig the presence of a predator at 150 yards simply by hearing the noise of ankle-bones cracking. Older kangaroos were apt to cast their young from their marsupial pouch if chased by dingos, to distract the dogs from their main prey.

Cultural centre
The Wotjobaluk Knowledge Place, apart from teaching language (see above), displays artworks, conducts workshops, and is a centre for social get-togethers.

Alternative names

 Buibatjali (dialect name), buibatyalli
 Gnallbagootchyourl
 Gourrbaluk (Gour =Lake Hindmarsh, name used by Wemba-Wemba)
 Kurm-me-lak (horde name = Gromiluk)
 Malikunditj (northern tribal exonym)
 Malleegunditch
 Ngalbagutja denoting Lake Albucutya, a Wemba-Wemba exonym used of northern hordes of the Wotjobaluk)
 Tjatijala (regional name west of Lake Hindmarsh)
 Tyattyalla, Djadjala
 Wattyabullak
 Wimmera tribe
 Woitu-bullar (plural of man as used in Barababaraba tribe)
 Wotjo-ba-laiuruk (lit. "men and women")
 Woychibirik (name for man = wotjo])
 Wuttyabullak, Wuttyuballeak

Some words
 dhallung (male or buck klangaroo)
 gal. (dog)
 kulkun. (a boy)
 laiaruk. (a woman)
 lanangurk. (a girl).
 mindyun (a kangaroo)
 muty (doer or female kangaroo)
 winya nyua. (Who is there?)
 wotjo (a man)
fletcher (creepy)

Notes

Citations

Sources

Aboriginal peoples of Victoria (Australia)